The Battle of the Wazzir was the name given to several riots of Australian, British and New Zealand troops in Cairo, Egypt, during World War I. The main incident occurred on 2 April 1915, but a smaller incident also took place on 31 July that year. In the aftermath of the war, another incident took place in February 1919.

Major riot (2 April 1915)
The main riot took place  on 2 April 1915. The riot took hold in a street called "Haret el Wasser", part of the Wagh El Birket area of Cairo where there were a large number of brothels and drinking establishments. At its peak about 2,500 Australian and New Zealand soldiers were involved, many of whom were intoxicated. The soldiers were reported to have had an assortment of complaints, including recent price increases, poor quality drinks, and concerns about the spread of venereal disease. The riot resulted in considerable damage – estimated at several hundred pounds worth – to several brothels which were set on fire; firefighters who responded to the blaze were also accosted. In response, mounted police were dispatched, as well as yeomanry, Lancashire Territorials and military police.

As 2 April 1915 was Good Friday, many ANZAC troops waiting to go to the Gallipoli Campaign were on leave, and many of them went to the Birka. They had an accumulation of grievances against the entertainments in the Birka: beer adulterated with water or even urine; high prices; much venereal disease among the area's prostitutes; theft and general dishonesty; an incident when an English soldier from Manchester found his sister serving as a nude dancer and prostitute there (she had accepted an offer for a job in domestic service, but her purported employer took her to Cairo and left her there: see white slave trade), and when he tried to take her away, the brothel's staff threw him out of an upstairs window. About 4000 troops rioted and wrecked and burnt many buildings, and threw prostitutes and pimps out onto the streets and their possessions after them; furniture including a piano was thrown out of upstairs windows; and they rescued the English soldier's sister. The riot started about 4 pm or 5 pm and ended by 10 pm.

A view at the time, that the wanton destruction and assaults were just ‘a bit Of fun’, has persisted, despite evidence of the seriousness of the criminal behaviour during the event.

Australian soldier Eric Ward wrote:

Early in 1915 the noted Australian World War 1 historian C.E.W. Bean had expressed concern at the behaviour of some Australian soldiers

In fact 322 soldiers were sent back to Australia for various reasons including disciplinary. Surprisingly Bean wrote that  the two Wasser riots while ‘not   heroic’, ‘differed very little from what at Oxford and Cambridge and in Australian universities is known as a "rag".

Even a recently as 2015, a blog written for the Australian War Memorial on the centenary of the incident describes it as 

Private Victor Laidlaw, of the 2nd Field Ambulance, found the event rather more disturbing and in his account he described a 'disgraceful occurrence':

The most balanced and reliable account comes from historian Graham Wilson who has studied the event in detail. His view is that:
"The truth, however, is far more sordid, far less heroic and righteous, and casts absolutely no credit whatsoever on the AIF."
He identifies that the Court of Inquiry (convened 3 April 1915) "found that the riot grew out of an incident arising from two or three disgruntled Australians trying to extort money from some prostitutes who they said had given them VD."

According to Australian Trooper James Brownhill, the men had their leave cut which was a significant punishment. He wrote home on 12 April 1915 giving his view of the riot:

Riot of 31 July 1915
A second incident occurred on 31 July 1915, which was subsequently described as the "Second Battle of the Wazzir".

Incidents of February 1919
In February 1919, the Auckland Star recounted another incident, following the armistice:

References

Newspapers
 The hard Case
 Dennis's Life And Literary Career

Books

Diaries

External links
 Images: The First Battle of the Wasa‘a or Wozzer
 Images: ANZAC Scrapbook of James Shanahan "Amy"
 A poem: "Battle of the Wazzir" by C. J. Dennis
 Destroyed Brothels
 The 2nd Battle of the Wozzer
 The first encounter of the Australians and New Zealanders with an enemy

1915 in Egypt
Military history of Australia during World War I
Riots and civil disorder in Egypt
1915 riots
April 1915 events
1910s in Cairo
1915 in military history
Egypt in World War I
New Zealand in World War I